Branko Skroče (born 17 May 1955 in Zadar) is a former Croatian basketball player who competed for Yugoslavia in the 1980 Summer Olympics.

See also
Yugoslav First Federal Basketball League career stats leaders

References

1955 births
Living people
Yugoslav men's basketball players
1978 FIBA World Championship players
Croatian men's basketball players
Olympic basketball players of Yugoslavia
Basketball players at the 1980 Summer Olympics
Olympic gold medalists for Yugoslavia
Olympic medalists in basketball
Basketball players from Zadar
KK Zadar players
Medalists at the 1980 Summer Olympics
FIBA World Championship-winning players